Lövånger (Lövånger dialect Levanger, Ume Sami Liävåŋkkere) is a locality situated in Skellefteå Municipality, Västerbotten County, Sweden with 761 inhabitants in 2010.

References

External links
 
Lövånger Portal

Populated places in Västerbotten County
Populated places in Skellefteå Municipality